Richard Lewis Deacon (May 14, 1922 – August 8, 1984) was an American television and motion picture actor, best known for playing supporting roles in television shows such as The Dick Van Dyke Show, Leave It To Beaver, and The Jack Benny Program along with minor roles in films such as Invasion of the Body Snatchers (1956) and Alfred Hitchcock's The Birds (1963).

Career
Deacon often portrayed pompous, prissy, and/or imperious figures in film and television. He made appearances on The Jack Benny Program as a salesman and a barber, and on NBC's Happy as a hotel manager. He made a brief appearance in Alfred Hitchcock's film The Birds (1963). He played a larger role in Invasion of the Body Snatchers (1956) as a physician in the "book-end" sequences added to the beginning and end of the film after its original previews.

In Billy Wilder's 1957 film adaptation of Charles Lindbergh’s The Spirit of St. Louis, Deacon portrayed the chairman of the Columbia Aircraft Corporation, Charles A. Levine.

His best-known roles are milksop Mel Cooley (producer of The Alan Brady Show) on CBS's The Dick Van Dyke Show (1961–1966) and Fred Rutherford on Leave It to Beaver (1957–1963), although Deacon played Mr. Baxter in the 1957 Beaver pilot episode "It's a Small World". He co-starred as Tallulah Bankhead's butler in an episode of The Lucy–Desi Comedy Hour called "The Celebrity Next Door". Deacon played Roger Buell on the second season of TV's The Mothers-in-Law (1967–1969), replacing Roger C. Carmel in the role. He played Principal "Jazzbo" Conroy in The Danny Thomas Show (1958). He also appeared in the 1960 Perry Mason episode The Case of the Red Riding Boots as Wilmer Beaslee.

In Carousel (1956), the film adaptation of the Rodgers & Hammerstein stage musical, Deacon had a bit role as the policeman who admonishes Julie and Mr. Bascombe about Billy Bigelow in the "bench scene". It was one of the few films in which he did not wear glasses, as were his roles in Abbott and Costello Meet the Mummy (1955), and the 1954 costumer Désirée, where he played Jean Simmons' elder brother, an 18th-century Marseilles silk merchant. Philadelphia native Deacon played the role of Morton Stearnes' butler, George Archibald, whose courtroom testimony is a turning point in The Young Philadelphians (1959), starring Paul Newman. He played an imbibing justice of the peace, Reverend Zaron, in the 1957 Budd Boetticher western Decision at Sundown.

Deacon appeared in some Westerns and many sitcoms, including It's a Great Life, The People's Choice, How to Marry a Millionaire, Guestward, Ho!, Pete and Gladys, The Donna Reed Show, Gunsmoke, The Real McCoys (in the episode "The Tax Man Cometh", he clashes with series star Walter Brennan over property tax assessments in the San Fernando Valley), Get Smart, Bonanza (a deceitful character who cheats the Cartwrights during their visit to San Francisco in the episode "San Francisco"), and The Rifleman (episode "The Hangman", in an uncredited role). In episode 5 of the first season of The Munsters, "Pike's Pique", he plays water district commissioner Mr. Pike, buying the underground rights to lay pipe. In The Addams Family, he administers Cousin Itt a battery of psychological tests in the episode "Cousin Itt and the Vocational Counselor". In 1966, he appeared on Phyllis Diller's short-lived television sitcom, The Pruitts of Southampton. He also guest starred in the NBC family drama National Velvet, and in the ABC/Warner Bros. crime drama Bourbon Street Beat, and played Mr. Whipple on The Twilight Zone in the 1964 episode "The Brain Center at Whipple's". In 1967, Deacon played Ralph Yarby, director of security for lumber baron D.J. Mulrooney, in Disney's The Gnome-Mobile. In 1968, he played Dean Wheaton in the Walt Disney film Blackbeard's Ghost. He was also an occasional panelist in the 1970s/early 1980s versions of Match Game. In 1970, he appeared in four episodes of The Beverly Hillbillies as a psychiatrist treating Granny.

In 1971, Deacon co-starred, along with Elaine Joyce, in the final episode of Green Acres which was a backdoor pilot for a proposed sitcom titled "The Blonde" or "Carol". Joyce played Oliver's former "dizzy blonde" secretary, Carol Rush, who now lives in Los Angeles with her sister and brother-in-law. Deacon played her no-nonsense boss, Mr. Oglethorpe, who Carol manages to save from a real estate scam. The pilot was not picked up.

In 1969, he co-starred on Broadway as Horace Vandergelder in the long-running musical Hello, Dolly!, reuniting him onstage with Diller, who played the title character.

Deacon appeared on the Match Game-Hollywood Squares Hour in 1983 as a game show participant / celebrity guest star.

In 1983, Deacon reprised his role of Fred Rutherford in the television movie Still the Beaver, a sequel to the original TV series. When the television movie spawned a series of the same name on The Disney Channel, he was to reprise the role but died weeks before the series began production.

In 1984, Deacon had a cameo role in the teen comedy film Bad Manners.

Personal life
Although he was born in Philadelphia, he and his family later moved to Binghamton, New York, living on the west side of that city. He attended West Junior High and Binghamton Central High School, where he met fellow Binghamton resident Rod Serling.

During World War II, Deacon served in the United States Army medical corps. In 1946, upon completion of his service, he returned to Binghamton where he resumed living with his parents. He worked in occupations such as laboratory technician and intern at Binghamton General Hospital. He later attended Ithaca College, first as a medical student, but later developed an interest in acting, engaging in some nighttime radio announcing.

Deacon was a gourmet chef in addition to working as an actor. In the 1970s and 1980s, he wrote a series of cookbooks and hosted a Canadian television series on microwave oven cooking.

While not widely known during Deacon's lifetime, he was a charitable man. At his memorial service, a number of people previously unknown to Deacon's friends and colleagues spoke of how Deacon had provided for needy people and charitable organizations during his life.

Deacon never married. According to academic writers David L. Smith and Sean Griffin, Deacon was gay, and was among "a number of actors and actresses who were closeted homosexuals" working in Hollywood and often employed in Disney films.

Death
Deacon died of cardiovascular disease on August 8, 1984, at age 62. His remains were cremated and the ashes scattered at sea.

Selected filmography

 Invaders from Mars (1953) as MP (uncredited)
 Them! (1954) as Bald Reporter at L.A. News Conference (uncredited)
 Shield for Murder (1954) as The Professor (uncredited)
 Private Hell 36 (1954) as Mr. Mace (uncredited)
 Rogue Cop (1954) as Stacey (uncredited)
 Désirée (1954) as Etienne Clary (uncredited)
 Cry Vengeance (1954) as 'Shiny' Sam - Bartender (uncredited)
 Prince of Players (1955) as Theatre Manager (uncredited)
 Blackboard Jungle (1955) as Mr. Stanley (uncredited)
 This Island Earth (1955) as Pilot (uncredited)
 Abbott and Costello Meet the Mummy (1955) as Semu
 Lay That Rifle Down (1955) as Glover Speckleton
 My Sister Eileen (1955) as Baker's Receptionist (uncredited)
 The Kettles in the Ozarks (1955) as Big Trout (uncredited)
 Good Morning, Miss Dove (1955) as Mr. Spivvy (uncredited)
 Invasion of the Body Snatchers (1956) as Dr. Harvey Bassett (uncredited)
 Carousel (1956) as First Policeman (uncredited)
 Hot Blood (1956) as Mr. Swift (uncredited)
 When Gangland Strikes (1956) as Dixon Brackett, Prosecuting Attorney (uncredited)
 The Scarlet Hour (1956) as Mr. Elman, Jeweller (uncredited)
 The Proud Ones (1956) as Barber (uncredited)
 Francis in the Haunted House (1956) as Jason
 The Solid Gold Cadillac (1956) as Williams, McKeever's assistant (uncredited)
 The Power and the Prize (1956) as Howard Carruthers
 Affair in Reno (1956) as H.L. Denham, Attorney
 Leave It to Beaver (1957-1963) as Fred Rutherford 
 Spring Reunion (1957) as Sidney (uncredited)
 The Spirit of St. Louis (1957) as Charles Levine, President Columbia Aircraft Co. (uncredited)
 Designing Woman (1957) as Larry Musso (uncredited)
 My Man Godfrey (1957) as Farnsworth
 Decision at Sundown (1957) as Reverend Zaron
 Kiss Them for Me (1957) as Bill Hotchkiss (uncredited)
 The High Cost of Loving (1958) as Obstetrician (uncredited)
 The Last Hurrah (1958) as Graves (uncredited)
 A Nice Little Bank That Should Be Robbed (1958) as Milburn Schroeder
 The Remarkable Mr. Pennypacker (1958) as Sheriff
 The Young Philadelphians (1959) as George Archibald
 It Started with a Kiss (1959) as Capt. Porter (uncredited)
 The Man Who Understood Women (1959) as Rossi (uncredited)
 A Summer Place (1959) as Pawnbroker (uncredited)
 -30- (1959) as Chapman
 North to Alaska (1960) as Angus - Hotel Desk Clerk (uncredited)
 The Rifleman (1960) as Col. Jebediah Sims (uncredited)
 All in a Night's Work (1961) as Fur Salesman (uncredited)
 Everything's Ducky (1961) as Dr. Deckham
 Lover Come Back (1961) as Dr. Melnick (uncredited)
 The Dick Van Dyke Show (1961-1966) as Mel Cooley  
 That Touch of Mink (1962) as Mr. Miller (uncredited)
 Mister Ed (1962) as Dr. Baker
 The Birds (1963) as Mitch's City Neighbor
 Critic's Choice (1963) as Harvey Rittenhouse
 Who's Minding the Store? (1963) as Tie Salesman
 The Raiders (1963) as Commissioner Mailer
 The Patsy (1964) as Sy Devore
 Dear Heart (1964) as Mr. Cruikshank
 The Munsters (1964) as Mr. Pike
 The Disorderly Orderly (1964) as Secondary Supporting Role (uncredited)
 John Goldfarb, Please Come Home! (1965) as Secretary of Defense Charles Maginot
 Billie (1965) as Principal Arnold Wilson
 That Darn Cat! (1965) as Drive-in Manager
 Don't Worry, We'll Think of a Title (1966) as Mr. Travis / Police Chief
 Lt. Robin Crusoe, U.S.N. (1966) as Survival Manual Narrator (uncredited)
 Rango (1967) as Pennypacker
 Enter Laughing (1967) as Pike
 The Gnome-Mobile (1967) as Ralph Yarby
 The King's Pirate (1967) as Swaine
 The Mothers-In-Law (1967-1969) as Roger Buell
 Blackbeard's Ghost (1968) as Dean Wheaton
 The One and Only, Genuine, Original Family Band (1968) as Charlie Wrenn
 Lady in Cement (1968) as Arnie Sherwin
 Persecución hasta Valencia (1968) as Records clerk
 Here's Lucy (1971) as Harvey Hoople
 Here's Lucy (1972) as Elmer Zellerbach
 The Man from Clover Grove (1975) as Charlie Strange
 CHiPs, season 1, episode 5 (1977)
 Rabbit Test (1978) as First Newscaster
 Getting Married (1978) as Wedding Director
 Piranha (1978) as Earl Lyon
 The Happy Hooker Goes Hollywood (1980) as Joseph Rottman
 Murder Can Hurt You (1980) as Mr. Burnice
 Still the Beaver (1983) as Fred Rutherford
 Growing Pains (1984) as Ticket Salesman

References

External links
 
 

1922 births
1984 deaths
American chefs
American male chefs
American male film actors
American male musical theatre actors
American male television actors
American LGBT actors
LGBT people from Pennsylvania
Male actors from Philadelphia
Bennington College alumni
20th-century American male actors
20th-century American singers
Actors from Binghamton, New York
20th-century American male singers
20th-century American LGBT people